A Thief in Paradise (Italian: Un ladro in paradiso) is a 1952 Italian comedy film directed by Domenico Paolella and starring Nino Taranto, Hélène Rémy and Francesco Golisano. It was expanded from a dialect poem written by Eduardo De Filippo. It was shot at Cinecittà Studios in Rome.

Plot
Vincent and Gennaro live by their wits and petty theft in the city of Naples. On Christmas Eve, Gennaro steals a service of glasses and gives it to his girlfriend Nannarella, a poor and honest seamstress . Unfortunately, it was discovered, and Gennaro and Vincenzo are arrested. While it is recommended to St. Joseph, it seems that they shower them with a gesture of their goodwill. Released from jail after three months full of good intentions, they are forgiven and Nannarella resumes contact with Gennaro. Since Vincent and Gennaro cannot find honest work, the two are forced to steal more.

Cast
Nino Taranto as  Vincenzo De Pretore
Francesco Golisano as Gennarino 
Hélène Rémy as Nanninella
Filippo Scelzo as The Surgeon
Carlo Tamberlani as Saint Joseph
Salvatore Costa as Father Carmine
Fanfulla as The Cheater
Marisa Finiani as Donna Carmela
Carlo Delle Piane
Carlo Pisacane
Amedeo Girardi
Pina Piovani
Luigi Pisano
Manfredi Polverosi

References

Bibliography
 Bender, Robert Gene. The Dialect Theatre of Eduardo de Filippo. Stanford University, 1963.
 Dyer, Richard. Nino Rota: Music, Film and Feeling. Bloomsbury Publishing, 2019.

External links
 

1952 films
Films scored by Nino Rota
1950s Italian-language films
Films directed by Domenico Paolella
Italian comedy films
1952 comedy films
Italian black-and-white films
1950s Italian films
Films shot at Cinecittà Studios
Films set in Naples